The 48th Air Transport Squadron is an inactive United States Air Force unit. Its last was assigned to the 1502d Air Transport Wing, Military Air Transport Service, stationed at Hickam Air Force Base, Hawaii. It was inactivated on 25 June 1965.

History
The squadron was first organized during World War II as a ferrying squadron in the Mediterranean Theater of Operations.

Reestablished as the 48th Air Transport Squadron in 1952 to replace the 1264th Air Transport Squadron, which had been organized in 1948 as the 2d Air Transport Squadron, a Douglas C-54 Skymaster transport squadron. That squadron was redesignated on 1 October 1948 to comply with the requirement that Table of Distribution units be numbered with four digits.

Upgraded to Boeing C-97 Stratofreighter and Douglas C-124 Globemaster II long distance intercontinental transports. Flew over MATS Pacific routes from Hawaii until inactivated in 1965 with the phaseout of the C-124.

Lineage
 Constituted as the 48th Ferrying Squadron
 Activated c. 9 July 1942
 Redesignated 48th Transport Squadron c. 29 March 1943
 Disbanded on 20 September 1943
 Reconstituted as the 48th Air Transport Squadron, Heavy on 20 June 1952
 Activated on 20 July 1952
 Redesignated 48th Air Transport Squadron''', Medium on 1 April 1960
 Discontinued and inactivated on 25 June 1965

Assignments
 14th Ferrying Group, c. 9 July 1942 – 20 September 1943
 1500th Air Transport Group (later 1502d Air Transport Group), 20 July 1952
 1502d Air Transport Wing, 1 May 1958 - 20 Jul 1952

Stations
 Bathurst, Gambia, c. 9 July 1942
 Marrakech, French Morocco, c. February 1943 – 20 September 1943
 Hickam Air Force Base, Hawaii, 20 July 1952 - 25 June 1965

Aircraft
 Douglas C-54 Skymaster, 1948-1949
 Boeing C-97 Stratofreighter, 1949-1956
 Douglas C-118, 1956-1965
 Douglas C-124 Globemaster, 1955-1965

References

Notes

Bibliography

 

0048
Military units and formations in Hawaii